The Forney Ridge Trail is an American hiking trail, in the Great Smoky Mountains National Park of Swain County, North Carolina. The trail descends from just beneath the highest summit in the national park, Clingmans Dome, along Forney Ridge and passes through Andrews Bald (elev. 5,860 ft) before terminating at a junction with the Springhouse Branch Trail.

Vital information
 Due to its location high in the crest of the Great Smoky Mountains, The Forney Ridge Trail is one of very few in the national park that actually descends from its trailhead.

Landmarks/overlooks
 Clingmans Dome (via half mile, paved trail near the trailhead)
 Forney Ridge
 Andrews Bald

Trail synopsis

Trailhead to Andrews Bald
The Forney Ridge Trail begins easily enough at the base of the paved trail to the Clingmans Dome observation tower. The first  of the trail consists of a series of leveled, rocky platforms, put together by the national park service apparently due to the previously hazardous, steep, rocky slope. At the end of these "stairs" the trail comes to a fork with a side trail that leads on to the Appalachian Trail about a half mile up (and not far past that to the observation tower at Clingmans Dome), and the Forney Ridge Trail continuing on to the left, down along the ridge for which it is named.

Although the trail is relatively easy, it is advisable to use caution. The early portion can be slippery in icy winters and may contain loose rocks. In the 1920s the trees here were swept by a wildfire which has given the area an awkward mix of young shrubbery and woods, but this portion is rather short and within a mile the trail passes into the spruce-fir zone, which has also had problems more recently with air pollution and the balsam wooly adelgid. At  the trail comes to a split with the Forney Creek Trail, which, to the right, leads down  to Fontana Lake.

In mid-June, the bald provides a wonderful display of Catawba rhododendron and flame azalea, the best show for the least effort, although it can’t quite match that of the more isolated Gregory Bald. Due to the natural encroachment of the forest onto the once grazed open balds in the park, Andrews Bald (along with the aforementioned Gregory Bald) has been designated as an experimental research zone, whereby the national park service will preserve the area as a grassy bald.

Andrews Bald to Springhouse Branch Trail
This trail can be taken in conjunction with the Noland and then later Forney Creek Trails back up to the Forney Ridge Parking Area for a long  backpacking loop, or, by turning left at the Forney Creek Trail, down to Fontana Lake in North Carolina.

Maps and Directions

Topographic Maps
The Forney Ridge Trail is shown on the following 1:24,000-scale topographic maps published by the National Park Service:

Sources
 
 

Hiking trails in Great Smoky Mountains National Park
Protected areas of Sevier County, Tennessee